Edward Burleson (December 15, 1798 – December 26, 1851) was the third vice president of the Republic of Texas. After Texas was annexed to the United States, he served in the State Senate. Prior to his government service in Texas, he was a commander of Texian Army forces during the Texas Revolution. Before moving to Texas, he served in militias in Alabama, Missouri, and Tennessee, and fought in the War of 1812. Burleson was the soldier who was given Santa Anna's sword when he surrendered.

Early life
Known as the "Old Indian Fighter", Burleson was a veteran of the War of 1812 and had served in the Missouri and Texas militias.  In October 1835 he was appointed a lieutenant colonel in the Texas army and served under Stephen F. Austin in the opening stages of the Texas Revolution.  During the Siege of Béxar, Burleson served as the second-in-command to Gen. Austin, and in November 1835 he was elected Major General of Texas Volunteers and took command of the volunteer army besieging San Antonio de Béxar and received the surrender of Mexican general Martín Perfecto de Cos.  In March, he was appointed a Colonel of Texas Regulars and led the First Volunteer Infantry Regiment during the Runaway Scrape and at the Battle of San Jacinto.

With the capture of Antonio López de Santa Anna at San Jacinto, the Mexican general rode double into Sam Houston's camp on the horse of Joel Walter Robison, a soldier in most of the revolutionary battles and later a member of the Texas House of Representatives from Fayette County.

Burleson continued to serve in the Republic of Texas army after the war and was eventually promoted brigadier general of Texas Regulars.

His brother Jacob was killed and mutilated in a battle with Comanches in 1839.

Political service
On account of his military credentials, Burleson was elected to the Texas Senate in September 1838, as a local representative for Bastrop, Gonzales, and Fayette Counties.

He served as Vice-President of the Republic of Texas in President Sam Houston's second term from 1841 to 1844.  He was a Presidential candidate in the Texas Presidential election of 1844, but he was defeated by Anson Jones.

Although he served under Sam Houston, the two despised each other.

Burleson was also involved in the Mexican–American War (1846–1848), after Texas was annexed by the U.S.

The location of his grave is in what later became the Texas State Cemetery, in Austin.

Private life

Edward was the son of James B. Burleson, a company captain in the volunteer American army in the War of 1812 and later a participant in the Texas Revolution, as a Captain under his son's command. Edward learned of life in the field as an aide to his father, who could neither read nor write. Aaron Burleson, his grandfather, had fought as a minuteman in the Revolutionary War. He was a second cousin of Baylor University president Rufus Columbus Burleson.

Edward married Sarah Griffen Owen on April 25, 1816, in Madison County, Alabama.

In May 1830, Burleson arrived at San Felipe de Austin as a prospective settler. After scouting the land around the upper Colorado River, Burleson submitted an application to be a colonist. He then returned to Tennessee, where the rest of his family was living at the time, and brought them to Texas. Upon their arrival, Burleson and his family settled near the fledgling community of Bastrop. In the ensuing years, Burleson would become heavily involved with local affairs affecting Bastrop, Gonzales, and Fayette Counties, as he was elected to the Texas Senate in September 1838.

Memorials
Burleson County, Texas

See also
Edward Burleson Raymond, named after Edward Burleson

References

External links
 
 Entry for Edward Burleson from the Biographical Encyclopedia of Texas published 1880, hosted by the Portal to Texas History.
Sketch of Edward Burleson from A pictorial history of Texas, from the earliest visits of European adventurers, to A.D. 1879, hosted by the Portal to Texas History.
 

1798 births
1851 deaths
People of the Texas Revolution
Vice presidents of the Republic of Texas
Democratic Party Texas state senators
Presidents pro tempore of the Texas Senate
Army of the Republic of Texas generals
19th-century American politicians
People from Buncombe County, North Carolina